Tykocin  is a small town in north-eastern Poland, with 2,010 inhabitants (2012), located on the Narew river, in Białystok County in the Podlaskie Voivodeship. It is one of the oldest towns in the region, with its historic center designated a Historic Monument of Poland.

History

Middle Ages
The  name of Tykocin was first mentioned in the 11th century. Through the 14th century, it was a castellany in the Duchy of Masovia on the border with pagan Lithuania. Tykocin received its city rights from prince Janusz I of Warsaw in 1425, but several months later, the settlement was transferred to the Grand Duchy of Lithuania (within the Polish-Lithuanian Union) by the Polish king Władysław II Jagiełło. Shortly later, in around 1433, Duke Sigismund Kęstutaitis gave the town along with other surrounding villages to Jonas Gostautas, and it became the most important seat of the Lithuanian Gostautai noble family.

Early modern era

In the 1542, upon the death of Gostautai family's last member, the town was acquired by Polish king and Lithuanian Grand Prince Sigismund II Augustus who had the medieval stronghold remodelled into a Renaissance castle. One of the largest arsenals of Poland was located in Tykocin. It subsequently became a royal town of the Polish Crown, located within the Podlaskie Voivodeship in the Lesser Poland Province and was eventually awarded to Hetman Stefan Czarniecki for his military service during the Swedish invasion of Poland in 1661. In the 16th and 17th centuries, Tykocin was granted new privileges by kings Stephen Báthory and Władysław IV Vasa. Later on, through the marriage of Czarniecki's daughters, it passed to the Branicki (Gryf coat-of-arms) family. From 1513 until the Third Partition of Poland in 1795, Tykocin was a county (powiat) seat.

It was Tykocin, where in 1705, King Augustus II the Strong established the Order of the White Eagle, the highest and oldest Polish order.

Most of Tykocin's landmarks was built in this era, including the Holy Trinity Church, monasteries of the Congregation of the Mission and the Bernardines, the former 17th-century military hospital, the synagogue and the statue of hetman Stefan Czarniecki.

Late modern era and recent times
Following the Partitions of Poland Tykocin was annexed by Prussia and Izabella Poniatowska-Branicka sold the town to the Prussian government in 1795. In 1807, it was briefly regained by Poles as part of the Duchy of Warsaw in accordance to the Treaty of Tilsit. In 1815, it became part of the Congress Kingdom of Poland, later on forcibly annexed by Imperial Russia.

During the November Uprising, on 21 May 1831, Polish insurgents won a battle against the Russians at Tykocin. After the massacres of Polish protesters committed by the Russians in Warsaw in 1861, Polish demonstrations and clashes with Russian soldiers took place in Tykocin. Shortly after the outbreak of the January Uprising, Tykocin was the site of a battle between Polish insurgents and Russian troops on 24-25 January 1863. During the uprising, Tykocin was attacked by a Cossack unit led by Captain Dmitriyev, who forced the populace to sign a request to the tsarist administration to make him the town's military superior. In this way, he obtained office, and then committed macabre murders of the inhabitants. Dmitryev's cruelty even caused the Russians themselves to report him to the tsarist authorities, but he was only fined.

Tykocin was reintegrated with Poland after the country regained independence after World War I in 1918. During the interwar period, the population of Tykocin had reached an estimated 4,000 inhabitants.

During World War II, it was occupied by the Soviets from 1939 to 1941 and the Germans from 1941 to 1944. The Jewish population of Tykocin estimated at 2,000 people was eradicated by Nazi Germans during the Holocaust. On 25–26 August 1941, the Jewish residents of Tykocin were assembled at the market square for "relocation", and then marched and trucked by the Nazis into the nearby Łopuchowo forest, where they were executed in waves into pits by SS Einsatzkommando Zichenau-Schroettersburg under SS-Obersturmführer Hermann Schaper. A memorial now exists outside the town for the Tykocin pogrom.

In 1950, Tykocin lost its town rights due to population loss in World War II, only to regain it in 1993. From 1975 to 1998, it was administratively located in the former Białystok Voivodeship.

Points of interest 

Tykocin contains a preserved historic center listed as a Historic Monument of Poland. Notable heritage sights and points of interest include:
Tykocin Castle built before 1469, extended in 16th century and partially reconstructed in 2005
The Baroque Tykocin Synagogue Bejt ha-Kneset ha-Godol, built in 1642, one of the best preserved in Poland from that period and a major tourist attraction.
A baroque Church of the Holy Trinity and former monastery of Congregation of Mission founded in 1742 by Jan Klemens Branicki
Baroque Bernardine Monastery from 1771–90
Monument of hetman Stefan Czarniecki from 1763
Former military hospital from 1633–1647, the Alumnat, one of the oldest of its kind in Europe, now a hotel
Baroque manor house Rezydencja ekonomiczna, currently the Center of Culture, Sport and Tourism
Catholic cemetery, dating back to the 18th century
Jewish cemetery – one of the oldest in Poland
Monument of the White Eagle from 1982, referring to the establishment of the Order of the White Eagle in Tykocin in 1705
Abundance of white storks and their nests in the area

Transport
The Voivodeship road 671 runs through Tykocin and links it with the S8 highway, which passes nearby, south of the town.

Notable individuals 
 Joshua Höschel ben Joseph, a Polish rabbi born in Wilno
 Jan Klemens Branicki, Field Crown Hetman of the Polish–Lithuanian Commonwealth
 Bolesław Gebert, Communist Party official 
 Łukasz Górnicki, Chancellor of Sigismund Augustus of Poland
 Mikołaj Ostroróg, a Polish-Lithuanian nobleman
 Bogusław Radziwiłł, an Imperial Prince of the Holy Roman Empire
 Janusz Radziwiłł (1612-1655), Polish prince, magnate and Field Hetman of Lithuania
 Paweł Jan Sapieha, Hetman and military commander
 Jan Smółko (b. 1907, AK alias Lokalizator), wife Władysława (b. 1908), Polish Righteous among the Nations – produced over a hundred fake IDs for Tykocin Jews during World War II, based on Catholic parish records.
 Rebecca bat Meir Tiktiner (d. 1550)
 Krzysztof Wiesiołowski

References

External links 
Tykocin on the map of Poland, at www.pilot.pl
Tykocin Synagogue photos, at ddickerson.igc.org
"Tykocin – news, photos... all about this beautiful town," at www.tykocin1425.az.pl.
Plac Czarnieckiego 10 Anthropological project: art, history and heritage of Tykocin.
photos of Tykocin castle and events

Shtetls
Cities and towns in Podlaskie Voivodeship
Białystok County
Podlachian Voivodeship
Łomża Governorate
Białystok Voivodeship (1919–1939)
Belastok Region
Holocaust locations in Poland